Ober-Hilbersheim is an Ortsgemeinde – a municipality belonging to a Verbandsgemeinde, a kind of collective municipality – in the Mainz-Bingen district in Rhineland-Palatinate, Germany.

Geography

Location
The municipality lies southwest of Mainz on the Welzbach and is an agriculturally based community. The winegrowing centre belongs to the Verbandsgemeinde of Gau-Algesheim, whose seat is in the like-named town.

History
In 1108, Ober-Hilbersheim had its first documentary mention as Hilbridisheim.

Politics

Municipal council
The council is made up of 12 council members who were elected in a municipal election held on 13 June 2004 by majority vote.

Mayors
1946-????: Karl Lahr (FDP, as of 1956 FVP, as of 1957 DP)
2001-incumbent: Heiko Schmuck

Coat of arms
The municipality's arms might be described thus: Azure a horse's head couped at the neck Or langued gules.

Culture and sightseeing

Regular events
The Ober-Hilbersheim Wine and Art Fair takes place early every July.
The Ober-Hilbersheim Christmas Market is held on the second weekend in Advent.

Economy and infrastructure

Transport
The municipality is crossed by the L 415 state road. The Autobahnen A 60, A 61 and A 63 can be reached by car in 10 to 20 minutes.

Education
Municipal kindergarten

References

Further reading
Schmuck, Heiko: Ober-Hilbersheim. Illustrierte Dokumentation eines rheinhessischen Dorfes im 19. und 20. Jahrhundert. Horb am Neckar 1999.

External links

 Municipality’s official webpage 
Homepage of Bürgerinitiative Umwelt und Gesundheit Ober-Hilbersheim e.V. (“Ober-Hilbersheim Environment and Health Citizens’ Initiative”) and information page about Ober-Hilbersheim 

Mainz-Bingen